Milesia scutellata  is a species of hoverfly in the family Syrphidae.

Distribution
United States.

References

Insects described in 1924
Eristalinae
Diptera of North America
Hoverflies of North America
Taxa named by Frank Montgomery Hull